The TAZ 83 is a military camouflage pattern used by the Swiss Army for the Kampfanzug 57/70 (combat dress 57/70) and the TAZ 83 (Tarnanzug, camouflage dress 83). It also is known as "Alpenflage" or "pizza camouflage" among collectors of militaria as military surplus camouflage clothing it came on to the army surplus market in the 1990s.

Swiss Militärblachen with the TAZ 83 pattern are still in use in the Swiss Army along with Militärblachen with a green camo pattern (not the same pattern as the TAZ 90).

History
The pattern is based on an experimental all-terrain pattern that saw limited service in World War II by Germany's Waffen-SS and Wehrmacht called Leibermuster.

The Kampfanzug 57/70 was issued from 1957 to 1993 (after 1970 with a textile daypack) and the lighter TAZ 83 with different pattern from 1983 to 1993 for non-combat troops before both were replaced by the TAZ 90.

Pattern
The Kampfanzug 57/70 is a six-colour camouflage pattern consisting of a tan-coloured background with random white flecks with light green body, overprinted with green, red/reddish brown and black leaf shapes. The choice of red and green would at first glance seem to make this pattern very bright for something intended to conceal, but it works well for FIBUA (fighting in built-up areas) environments and alpine terrain.

Swiss soldiers have referred to it as "Vierfrucht-Pyjama", which translates loosely as 'four-fruit pyjamas'.

Users

Non-State Actors

 Some acquired by Kosovo Liberation Army.

See also
 TAZ 90

References

   

Military camouflage
Camouflage patterns
Military equipment of Switzerland
Military equipment introduced in the 1950s